, formerly known in English as Pusan Japanese School (PJS), is a Japanese international school in Suyeong District, Busan, South Korea,  from central Busan, and in proximity to Gwangalli Beach (a.k.a. Gwangan Beach). The Busan Japanese School is the Japanese overseas school that is physically closest to Japan itself.

It was established on October 1, 1975 (Showa 50).

In 2013 the school had 13 teachers teaching 47 students, with 38 in elementary school and nine in junior high school. By 2017 the student population was declining as Japanese companies sent fewer employees abroad in general and as the economy declined in Busan; Japanese companies by that time preferred assigning employees to Seoul.

Culture
The school song was written , while  made the lyrics. Kohsuke Obane created an English translation of the song that was posted on the school's official website.

References

Further reading
 Reports by former staff: 田上恭孝 (前釜山日本人学校 校長, 神奈川県横浜市立青木小学校 校長). "釜山日本人学校における国際理解教育・現地理解教育の深化を求めて." Tokyo Gakugei University.

External links
 Busan Japanese School
 

Busan
1975 establishments in South Korea
Educational institutions established in 1975
Japanese
Busan